The 1928 All-Big Six Conference football team consists of American football players chosen by various organizations for All-Big Six Conference teams for the 1928 college football season.  The selectors for the 1928 season included the Associated Press (AP).

All-Big Six selections

Ends
 Tom Churchill, Oklahoma (AP-1)
 Miller Brown, Missouri (AP-1)
 Harold Hauser, Kansas (AP-2)
 Cliff Ashburn, Nebraska (AP-2)

Tackles
 Babe Lyon, Kansas State (AP-1)
 Marion Broadstone, Nebraska (AP-1)
 Ray Richards, Nebraska (AP-2)
 Glen B. Munn, Nebraska (AP-2)

Guards
 Elmer Holm, Nebraska (AP-1)
 Danny McMullen, Nebraska (AP-1)
 John Shannon, Kansas (AP-2)
 Carl Kern, Iowa State (AP-2)

Centers
 Theodore James, Nebraska (AP-1)
 M. Burt Pearson, Kansas State (AP-2)

Quarterbacks
 Fay Russell, Nebraska (AP-1)
 Harry Lindblom, Iowa State (AP-2)

Halfbacks
 Clair Sloan, Nebraska (AP-1)
 Robert Mehrle, Missouri (AP-1)
 A. Lynwood Haskins, Oklahoma (AP-2)
 Paul Trauger, Iowa State (AP-2)

Fullbacks
 Blue Howell, Nebraska (AP-1)
 John Waldorf, Missouri (AP-2)

Key
AP = Associated Press

See also
1928 College Football All-America Team

References

All-Big Six Conference football team
All-Big Eight Conference football teams